John Hiromu Kitagawa (Japanese name ; October 23, 1931 – July 9, 2019), known professionally as , was an American-born Japanese businessman and talent manager. He was the founder and president of Johnny & Associates, a production agency for numerous popular boy bands in Japan. Kitagawa assembled, produced and managed more than a dozen popular bands, including Tanokin Trio, Hey! Say! JUMP, SMAP, Arashi, Kanjani8, V6, NEWS and KAT-TUN. Kitagawa's influence spread beyond music to the realms of theatre and television. Regarded as one of the most powerful figures in the Japanese entertainment industry, he held a virtual monopoly on the creation of boy bands in Japan for more than 40 years.

From 1988 to 2000, Kitagawa was the subject of a number of claims that he had taken advantage of his position to engage in improper sexual relationships with boys under contract to his talent agency. Kitagawa denied these claims, and in 2002 was awarded an  judgment against Shukan Bunshun, the magazine that had published such allegations. An appeal by the magazine followed, resulting in a partial reversal of the judgment. A 2004 appeal to the Supreme Court by Kitagawa was rejected.

Early life 
Born in 1931 in Los Angeles, California, United States, Kitagawa returned with his family to Japan in 1933. His father Rev. Taido Kitagawa was a Buddhist priest and the third head bishop of the Koyasan Buddhist Temple in Little Tokyo from 1924 to 1933. His older sister is Mary Yasuko Fujishima. Kitagawa went to America c. 1949, and taught English to orphans from the Korean War for the United States Army. In the early 1950s, he returned to Japan to work at the United States Embassy. While walking through Yoyogi Park in Tokyo, he encountered a group of boys playing baseball. He recruited them to form a singing group, acting as their manager. He named the group "Johnnys". Johnnys achieved a measure of success by using a then-novel formula of mixing attractive performers singing popular music with coordinated dance routines. Johnnys were the first all-male pop group in Japan, and set the pattern that Kitagawa would follow with his subsequent acts; the term "Johnny's" would come to apply generically to any of the performers under Kitagawa's employ. Concurrently, he graduated from Sophia University and received his bachelor's degree in International Studies.

Career

Founding Johnny & Associates 
In 1968, Kitagawa achieved wider success with a four-member boy band known as Four Leaves. The song and dance group met with success, as reflected by seven consecutive appearances on the annual invitation-only Kōhaku Uta Gassen, beginning in 1970. Four Leaves performed together for ten years before disbanding in 1978. Later, in 2002, Kitagawa oversaw the band's reunion. Kitagawa went on to assemble, produce and manage many of the top all-male bands in the country, including groups such as Hey! Say! JUMP, SMAP, Tokio, V6, Arashi, Tackey & Tsubasa, Kanjani8, NEWS, KAT-TUN, and KinKi Kids among many others. Kitagawa was able to expand his sphere of influence to include television, as his performers regularly appeared on television, with many appearing on their own variety programs.  They also regularly acted as pitchmen for commercial products, and appear in movies. The success of Kitagawa's performers led to increased profitability, as Johnny & Associates generated 2.9 billion yen in annual profits at the height of the boy band boom. During 1997, performers belonging to the talent agency appeared in more than 40 television programs and another 40 commercials. The success of his company made Kitagawa one of the richest men in Japan.

The formula 
Kitagawa repeatedly employed a standard formula in the development and marketing of his acts. Johnny & Associates held open tryouts for potential performers. The production agency recruited boys as young as ten into a talent pool known as Johnny's Juniors. Successful applicants lived in a company dormitory and attend a company-run school. They trained to hone their showmanship in the form of singing, dancing and acting. Kitagawa held an annual summer festival known as "Johnny's Summary".

Promising members of Johnny's Jr. appeared alongside of established members of Kitagawa's fold. The junior members acted as background dancers for the major acts to allow for name recognition prior to being launched as a separate group. The members of the Juniors also appeared in on Hachi-ji da J, a weekly television variety show. Members sang, danced, and performed in comedic sketches as they further developed the skills to graduate to a major act.  Kitagawa's focus was on the development of his groups as complete entertainers. Shonentai, for example, did not release a single until it had been together for more than seven years. "I'm not very interested in records," Kitagawa said in a 1996 interview. "Once you release a record, you have to sell that record. You have to push one song only. You can't think of anything else. It's not good for the artist."

Once launched, Kitagawa was known to use his established groups to induce television stations to report on his newer acts, and ensure favorable press coverage for his acts and himself. Programs that gave unfavorable coverage did not receive interviews or television appearance from popular stars managed by Kitagawa. Kitagawa maintained a high degree of control over his acts, to the extent that their images did not appear on the company website. Performers are expected to maintain a public image that is conducive to marketing to young women; as a result, members of bands produced by Kitagawa avoided public mention of their private lives. Kitagawa himself avoided the public spotlight as well. He rarely permited his photograph to be taken, and did not make public appearances with his groups.

Sexual harassment allegations

Initial claims
Rumors concerning Kitagawa and possible sexual harassment of the youth in his employ had surrounded the agency since 1988, when , a former member of Four Leaves, published a series of diaries under the title . Kita claimed that Kitagawa had used his position of influence over the group to make unwanted sexual advances towards the boys under contract to him. Similar allegations were made in a book published in 1996 by Junya Hiramoto, a former member of another of Kitagawa's bands. Hiramoto alleged that he had seen Kitagawa force a boy to have sex with him in one of the talent agency's dormitories, yet did nothing to stop it. Later, in 1999, the weekly magazine Shukan Bunshun printed a ten-part series that detailed numerous allegations of sexual improprieties. The accusers were a dozen teenage boys who had been recruited into the Johnny & Associates organization, who spoke on condition of anonymity. In addition, the series also accused Kitagawa of permitting minors in his employ to drink alcohol and smoke.

Lawsuit

Yoshihide Sakaue, a member of the Parliament, held a hearing on the matter in April 2000. Sakaue said that as a result of the media coverage, and in response to a request from a constituent, he wanted to examine whether government officials had properly investigated complaints about Kitagawa. Officials of the National Police Agency acknowledged that they had investigated Kitagawa's agency, but had not determined that sexual harassment had occurred. Officials did indicate that Kitagawa's company was warned about permitting minors to use alcohol and smoke cigarettes. The National Police and Welfare Ministry indicated that under the Ministry's understanding of the law, even if the allegations against Kitagawa were true, the acts could not be considered child abuse because Kitagawa was neither parent nor guardian to the boys in his employ. In addition, officials testified that neither the boys nor their parents had pursued a criminal complaint against Kitagawa. Kitagawa denied any wrongdoing, and his attorney characterized the claims as being from disgruntled former employees voicing discontent.  Kitagawa sued Shukan Bunshun for libel. Other than Shukan Bunshun, none of the major Japanese media covered the story of the allegations against Kitagawa, the hearing in Parliament, or the Kitagawa lawsuit. The New York Times attributed this lack of coverage to Kitagawa's influence over the popular media. Once Shukan Bunshun began publication of the series, Johnny & Associates denied the magazine, and the other media owned by its parent organization, access to any of its performers.

After protracted litigation, in 2002 the Tokyo District Court awarded Kitagawa an 8.8 million yen judgment against Shukan Bunshun, finding that the articles defamed him. Shukan Bunshun appealed the ruling. In a partial reversal of the district court, the Tokyo High Court in 2003 ruled that the Shukan Bunshun series did in fact defame Kitagawa; however, it ruled that the defamatory content of the articles was limited to the allegations that Kitagawa had provided minors with alcohol and tobacco products. The court found that the Shukan Bunshun had sufficient reason to accept as trustworthy, and publish, the sexual allegations by Kitagawa's former clients. Kitagawa appealed this decision to the Supreme Court, but in 2004 the court rejected his appeal.

Subsequent claims

In July 2019, Shūkan Bunshun posted another sexual assault allegation from a former Johnny Jr. who alleged that his first kiss was with Kitagawa, and because he resisted his advances, he was relegated to the corner of the stage during performances. In January 2021, Koki Maeda, a former member of 7 Men Samurai, stated through an interview with Arama! Japan that he was "certain" there were sexual relations between Kitagawa and Johnny's Jr. because he "had the privilege of deciding who deserved to debut." Moments after the interview was published, Maeda recanted his statement.

On March 7, 2023, BBC released a documentary centered on the sexual harassment claims against Kitagawa titled Predator: The Secret Scandal of J-Pop, narrated by journalist Mobeen Azhar. In response to the documentary, Johnny & Associates released a statement stating that they were working on creating "transparent organizational structures" that will be announced later in the year.

Death 
On July 9, 2019, Kitagawa died at a hospital in Tokyo after suffering a subarachnoid hemorrhage stroke on June 18, at the age of 87. A memorial concert was held on September 4, 2019 at the Tokyo Dome, with 154 Johnny's artists and other celebrities in attendance, including Akiko Wada and Dewi Sukarno. His body was cremated and his ashes were distributed to several others, one of whom was Masahiro Nakai.

References

Further reading 
 
  Documentary; video access restricted to the UK.

1931 births
2019 deaths
20th-century American businesspeople
American LGBT businesspeople
American people of Japanese descent
Businesspeople from Los Angeles
Japanese businesspeople
Talent managers